A Cor do Seu Destino is a 1986 Brazilian drama film directed by Jorge Durán and screenplay by José Joffily.

Cast 
Norma Bengell - Laura
Guilherme Fontes - Paulo
Júlia Lemmertz - Patrícia
Andréa Beltrão - Helena
Chico Diaz - Vitor Filho
Marcos Palmeira - Raul
Antônio Ameijeiras - Cônsul
Anderson Schreiber - Paulo (child)
Paulinho Mosca - Setúbal
Anderson Müller - Gordo
Duda Monteiro - Duda
Roberto Lee - Official

Awards 
1986: Festival de Brasília
Best Film (won)
Best Director (Jorge Durán) (won)
Best Supporting Actor (Chico Díaz) (won)
Best Supporting Actress (Júlia Lemmertz) (won)
Best Screenplay (Jorge Durán / José Joffily / Nelson Nadotti) (won)

1987: Cartagena Film Festival
Special Jury Award (won)

References

External links 
 

1986 films
1980s Portuguese-language films
Brazilian drama films
1986 drama films